Darrick Hamilton is an American academic and administrator who is currently the Henry Cohen Professor of Economics and Urban Policy and a University Professor at The New School for Social Research. He is also the director of the Institute for the Study of Race, Stratification and Political Economy at The New School. Prior to assuming these roles in January 2021, Hamilton was executive director of the Kirwan Institute for the Study of Race and Ethnicity at Ohio State University. He is also the Associate Director of the Diversity Initiative for Tenure in Economics (DITE, funded by the National Science Foundation and housed at the Samuel Dubois Cook Center for Social Equity) at Duke University; Senior Research Associate the Samuel DuBois Cook Center on Social Equity; a past President of the National Economic Association; and former Co-Associate Director of the American Economic Association Summer Training and Minority Fellowship Program.

Research 
As an applied microeconomist, Hamilton's research focuses on the area of stratification economics. His work involves understanding and examining the causes and consequences of racial and ethnic disparities, and the associated remedies to address these inequalities.
Some of his more prominent work has been on baby bonds with economist William A. Darity Jr. This proposed federal wealth redistribution program calls for the issuance of government-backed bonds for children born into poverty to be redeemed when they reach 18 years of age.  Hamilton's op-ed pieces have recently appeared in such media outlets as The New York Times, Huffington Post, among others.

Education 
Hamilton earned his Ph.D. in Economics from University of North Carolina, Chapel Hill in 1999, and his bachelor's degree (also in Economics) from Oberlin College.

Selected works
 Goldsmith, Arthur H., Darrick Hamilton, and William Darity. "From dark to light: Skin color and wages among African-Americans." Journal of Human Resources 42, no. 4 (2007): 701-738.
 Chiteji, Ngina S., and Darrick Hamilton. "Family connections and the black-white wealth gap among middle-class families." The Review of Black Political Economy 30, no. 1 (2002): 9-28.
 Hamilton, Darrick, William Darity Jr, Anne E. Price, Vishnu Sridharan, and Rebecca Tippett. "Umbrellas don’t make it rain: Why studying and working hard isn’t enough for Black Americans." New York: The New School 779 (2015): 780-781.
 Hamilton, Darrick, and William Darity Jr. "Can ‘baby bonds’ eliminate the racial wealth gap in putative post-racial America?." The Review of Black Political Economy 37, no. 3-4 (2010): 207-216.
 Hamilton, Darrick, Arthur H. Goldsmith, and William Darity Jr. "Shedding “light” on marriage: The influence of skin shade on marriage for black females." Journal of Economic Behavior & Organization 72, no. 1 (2009): 30-50.
 Goldsmith, Arthur H., Stanley Sedo, William Darity Jr, and Darrick Hamilton. "The labor supply consequences of perceptions of employer discrimination during search and on-the-job: Integrating neoclassical theory and cognitive dissonance." Journal of Economic Psychology 25, no. 1 (2004): 15-39.

Honors and awards 
Throughout his career, Hamilton has received a variety of honors and awards, including the Inspiring Leaders in STEM Award (INSIGHT into Diversity magazine, 2017); the Ford Foundation Postdoctoral Fellowship in Poverty, the Underclass and Public Policy; and the Robert Wood Johnson Scholar in Health Policy Research.

References 

Living people
Year of birth missing (living people)
Oberlin College alumni
University of North Carolina at Chapel Hill alumni
American social scientists
21st-century American economists
African-American economists
Microeconomists
Presidents of the National Economic Association
21st-century African-American people